The Atchison County Courthouse, located at the southwest corner of 5th and Parallel Streets in Atchison, is the seat of government of Atchison County, Kansas. The stone courthouse was built from 1896 to 1897 and replaced the county's first courthouse, which had been built in 1859. County officials wanted the courthouse to resemble the Franklin County Courthouse in Ottawa, so they hired that building's architect, George P. Washburn, to design the new courthouse. Washburn designed the building in the Romanesque Revival style. The courthouse's design features four corner towers, including a seven-story clock tower. The main entrance to the courthouse has a porch within a large arch; the doorway is contained in a smaller arch. The building has a hip roof with intersecting gable dormers; the towers have pyramidal roofs.

The courthouse was added to the National Register of Historic Places on April 16, 1975.

References

External links

Courthouses on the National Register of Historic Places in Kansas
Romanesque Revival architecture in Kansas
Government buildings completed in 1897
Buildings and structures in Atchison County, Kansas
County courthouses in Kansas
National Register of Historic Places in Atchison County, Kansas